Shanti Tyagi (1920-2001) was an Indian politician. He was a Member of Parliament, representing Uttar Pradesh in the Rajya Sabha the upper house of India's Parliament as a member of the Indian National Congress.

References

Rajya Sabha members from Uttar Pradesh
Indian National Congress politicians
1920 births
2001 deaths